Amphitrias is a genus of moth in the family Depressariidae. It contains the species Amphitrias cynica, which is found in Sri Lanka.

The wingspan is 17–21 mm. The forewings are ochreous-whitish, usually with some scattered irregular pale fuscous irroration or suffusion, especially beyond the cell and towards the tornus. The discal stigmata are dark fuscous and there is a row of blackish marginal dots around the apex and termen. The hindwings are ochreous-whitish.

References

Oditinae
Monotypic moth genera
Moths of Sri Lanka